Eggleston is an unincorporated community and census-designated place in Giles County, Virginia, United States. It was first listed as a CDP in the 2020 census with a population of 143.

Eggleston has a post office with ZIP code 24086. 

It lies at an elevation of 1,821 feet.

References

Unincorporated communities in Giles County, Virginia
Unincorporated communities in Virginia
Census-designated places in Giles County, Virginia
Census-designated places in Virginia